Nadja is a female name, that is used predominantly throughout the Mediterranean region, and the Arab world. Its origins are in the Arabic languages. The Serbian and Montenegrin spelling is Nađa.

Notable people with the name include:

 Nadja Auermann, German model and actress
 Nadja Benaissa, German singer, member of No Angels
 Nadja Bender, Danish fashion model
  (born 1975), Austrian news presenter
 Nađa Đurđevac (born 2002), Montenegrin football player
 Nađa Higl, Serbian swimmer
 Nađa Kadović (born 2003), Montenegrin handball player
 Nadja Käther, German track and field athlete
 Nadja Malacrida, pen-name of Louisa Nadia Green (1896—1934), British poet
 Nađa Ninković, Serbian volleyball player
 Nadja Peulen, German bass guitarist for Coal Chamber
 Nadja Salerno-Sonnenberg, US violinist
 Nadja Sieger (*1967), Swiss comedian
 Nađa Stanović (born 1999), Montenegrin football player

Fictional characters:
 Nadja, main character of the 1928 surrealist novel Nadja by André Breton
 Nadja, the main character of the anime Ashita no Nadja
 Nadja Nilsson, a fictional character in the Bert diaries
 Nadja, vampire character in the TV series What We Do in the Shadows
Nadja Chamack, a character in the animated series Miraculous: Tales of Ladybug and Cat Noir

See also
 Nadia

Feminine given names
Serbian feminine given names